Brooks & Dunn was an American country music duo consisting of Kix Brooks and Ronnie Dunn. Active from 1991 to 2011, the duo recorded ten albums for Arista Nashville. Brooks & Dunn won Top Vocal Duo from the Country Music Association in every year from 1991 to 2006, except in 2000, and the Academy of Country Music's Top Vocal Duo several years. They have also won two Grammy Awards, both for Grammy Award for Best Country Performance by a Duo or Group with Vocal.

Academy of Country Music Awards
The Academy of Country Music Awards are annual awards honoring the best in country music. Brooks & Dunn has won 23 awards from 67 nominations.

American Country Awards
The American Country Awards ran from 2010-2013, the awards show was fan-voted. Brooks & Dunn was nominated once.

American Country Countdown Awards
The American Country Countdown Awards are annual awards honoring country artists. Brooks & Dunn were honored with the Nash Icon Award recognizing their body of work and contribution to country music.

American Music Awards
The American Music Awards is an annual American music awards show, winners are voted upon by the general public. Brooks & Dunn has received twenty nominations, resulting in five awards.

Billboard Music Awards
The Billboard Music Awards are annual awards based on album and digital songs sales, streaming, radio airplay, touring and social engagement. Brooks & Dunn has won three awards out of four nominations.

Blockbuster Entertainment Awards
The Blockbuster Entertainment Awards was an annual awards show held from 1995-2001. Brooks & Dunn received two nominations, winning once.

BMI Awards
The BMI Awards are annual awards honoring the best in songwriting in different genres. Brooks & Dunn received one award.

CMT Flameworthy Video Music Awards
From 2002-2004 CMT held an annual awards show to showcase the best country music videos. Brooks & Dunn won one award.

CMT Music Awards
The CMT Music Awards is a fan-voted awards show for country music videos and television performances. Brooks & Dunn have one award from eight nominations.

Country Music Association Awards
The Country Music Association Awards are presented to country music artists and broadcasters to recognize outstanding achievement in the country music industry. Brooks & Dunn have won 17 awards from 46 nominations.

Grammy Awards
The Grammys are presented annually by the National Academy of Recording Arts and Sciences of the United States for outstanding achievements in the music industry. Brooks & Dunn has been honored with two wins and fifteen nominations.

Inspirational Country Music Awards
The Inspirational Country Music Association hold annual awards to honor artists who participate or promote the genre of Christian country music. Brooks & Dunn won two awards from four nominations.

People's Choice Awards
The People's Choice Awards are annual awards recognizing the people and the work of popular culture, voted on by the general public. Brooks & Dunn received one award.

Radio Music Awards
The Radio Music Awards was an annual American awards show that honored the year's most successful songs on mainstream radio. Brooks & Dunn were nominated once.

TNN/Music City News Awards
The Nashville Network and the Music City News held an annual awards show from 1990 to 1999, winners were voted upon by general public. Brooks & Dunn won Vocal Duo of the Year seven times.

Other honors
2008 Hollywood Walk of Fame, Inducted
2019 Country Music Hall of Fame, Inducted

References

Lists of awards received by American musician
Lists of awards received by musical group